The 2022 Corrientes Challenger was a professional tennis tournament played on clay courts. It was the second edition of the tournament which was part of the 2022 ATP Challenger Tour. It took place in Corrientes, Argentina between 13 and 19 June 2022.

Singles main-draw entrants

Seeds

 1 Rankings are as of 6 June 2022.

Other entrants
The following players received wildcards into the singles main draw:
  Alex Barrena
  Lautaro Midón
  Luciano Tacchi

The following players received entry into the singles main draw as alternates:
  Ignacio Monzón
  Jorge Panta
  Fermín Tenti

The following players received entry from the qualifying draw:
  Leonardo Aboian
  Guido Andreozzi
  Tomás Farjat
  Francisco Tomás Geschwind
  Mateo Nicolás Martínez
  Naoki Nakagawa

Champions

Singles

  Francisco Comesaña def.  Mariano Navone 6–0, 6–3.

Doubles

  Guido Andreozzi /  Guillermo Durán def.  Nicolás Álvarez /  Murkel Dellien 7–5, 6–2.

References

2022 ATP Challenger Tour
2022 in Argentine tennis
June 2022 sports events in Argentina